Froese is a German surname. Notable people with the surname include:

Adam Froese (born 1991), Canadian field hockey player
Allen Froese (born 1976), Canadian Singer and Musician; 2021 Junos nominee
Bianca Froese-Acquaye, German artist, author, painter, and widow of the late Edgar Froese
Bob Froese (born 1958), Canadian ice hockey player
Byron Froese (born 1991), Canadian ice hockey player
Charlotte Froese Fischer (born 1929), Canadian academic
Deborah Frose, Canadian Mennonite writer
Edgar Froese (1944–2015), German musician
Gayleen Froese (born 1972), Canadian writer and singer-songwriter
Grover Froese (1916–1982), American baseball umpire
Jacob Froese (1917–2003), Canadian politician
Jake Froese (1925–2013), Canadian politician
Jerome Froese (born 1970), German musician and son of the late Edgar Froese
Kianz Froese (born 1996), Canadian soccer player
Rainer Froese (born 1950), German scientist
Tom Froese (born 1952), Canadian politician

German-language surnames
Russian Mennonite surnames
German toponymic surnames